Charles Dickinson (December 20, 1780 – May 30, 1806) was an American attorney, and a famous duelist. An expert marksman, Dickinson died from injuries sustained in a duel with Andrew Jackson, who later became President of the United States. Dickinson was shot in the chest by the future President, following a garden duel regarding President Jackson's horse, Truxton. The shooting also is said to have stemmed from a drunken insult aimed at Rachel Jackson, future First Lady of the United States. Jackson himself was also wounded in the duel.

Dickinson was born at Wiltshire Manor in Caroline County, Maryland, the son of Elizabeth Walker and Henry Dickinson, the grandson of Sophia Richardson and Charles Dickinson (1695–1795), and the great-grandson of Rebecca Wynne (daughter of Dr. Thomas Wynne) and John Dickinson. He studied law under U.S. Chief Justice John Marshall, who wrote formal letters of introduction and recommendation for his student. Dickinson owned a house in Maryland for 3 years before moving to Tennessee, where he became a successful horse breeder and plantation owner. Within two years of his arrival in Tennessee, he courted and married the daughter of Captain Joseph Erwin. Unfortunately for Dickinson, he also ran afoul of fellow plantation owner and horse breeder, Andrew Jackson.

Horse race dispute
In 1805, a friend of Jackson's deprecated the manner in which Captain Erwin had handled a bet with Jackson over a horse race. Erwin's horse, Ploughboy, was scheduled to race Jackson's horse, Truxton; however, Erwin's horse had to drop out of the race.  According to the pre-race agreement, if a horse was unable to race, a forfeit fee of $800 would be paid to the injured party, in this case Jackson.  However, Jackson and Erwin disagreed on how this was to be paid, and a nasty quarrel ensued. Erwin's son-in-law, Charles Dickinson, became enraged and started quarreling with Jackson's friend, which led to Jackson becoming involved. Dickinson wrote to Jackson calling him a 'coward and an equivocator.' The affair continued, with more insults and misunderstandings, until Dickinson published a statement in the Nashville Review in May 1806, calling Jackson a 'worthless scoundrel, ... a poltroon and a coward.'

The political atmosphere in Nashville was heated by ambition. John Coffee, a friend of Jackson's, had fought a duel earlier in the year with one of Dickinson's associates, and there were larger political and sporting interests involved. The Jackson–Dickinson duel, like that between Aaron Burr—a political friend of Jackson's at the time—and Alexander Hamilton, had been developing over some time.

Although the actual issue that led to the duel was a horse race between Andrew Jackson and Dickinson's father-in-law, Joseph Erwin, Jackson had confronted Dickinson over a report that he had insulted his wife, Rachel Jackson. Dickinson said if he had, he was drunk at the time and apologized. Jackson accepted his apology, but there were probably still hard feelings between the two. Jackson and Erwin had scheduled their horse race in 1805. The stakes specified a winning pot of $2,000 paid by the loser, with an $800 forfeit if a horse could not run. Erwin's horse went lame, and after a minor disagreement about the type of forfeit payment, Erwin paid.

Later, one of Jackson's friends, while sitting in a Nashville store, shared what was probably a more lurid story about Erwin's disputed payment. When Dickinson heard the story, he sent a friend, Thomas Swann, to act as a go-between to inquire about what Jackson said about his father-in-law. Whether the friend misinterpreted or even misrepresented what was said by the two men, this minor misunderstanding flamed into full controversy.

In a confrontation at Winn's Tavern, Jackson struck Swann with his cane and called him a stupid meddler. Dickinson sent Jackson a letter calling him a coward about the same time that Swann wrote a column in a local newspaper calling Jackson a coward. Jackson responded in the same newspaper saying Swann was a "lying valet for a worthless, drunken, blackguard" meaning Dickinson.

That did it for Dickinson, who, after he returned from New Orleans in May 1806, published an attack on Jackson in the local newspaper, calling Jackson "a poltroon and a coward." After reading the article, Jackson sent Dickinson a letter requesting "satisfaction due me for the insults offered."

Death
Dueling was illegal in Tennessee.  However, under United States early 1800s criminal law, it was very difficult to be extradited across state lines. As a result, the two men met near Adairville, Kentucky, adjacent to the Tennessee border, on May 30, 1806. Dickinson left Nashville the day before the duel with his second and a group of friends, confident, even demonstrating his shooting skills at various stops along the way. Since Dickinson was considered an expert shot, Jackson and his friend, Thomas Overton, determined it would be best to let Dickinson fire first, hoping that his aim might be spoiled in his quickness. The obvious weakness of this tactic was, of course, that Jackson might not be alive to take aim.

Jackson and Overton also devised a strategy that, if Overton should win the coin toss to give the word to fire, he would ask Dickinson the question "Gentleman, are you ready?" purposefully after asking Jackson, and then immediately say "Fire" in an attempt to cause Dickinson to fire impulsively. Overton did indeed win the coin toss, and subsequently used this strategy.

Dickinson fired first, hitting Jackson in the chest. Incredibly, Jackson not only survived, merely wounded, but aimed his pistol and returned fire. Under the rules of dueling, Dickinson had to remain still as Jackson took his shot. Jackson's pistol stopped at half cock, so he drew back the hammer and aimed again, this time hitting Dickinson in the chest. Dickinson bled to death as a result of his wound.

The expert Dickinson had aimed at Jackson's heart, though the bullet had been slightly deflected by Jackson's brass button on his coat, which some claim was due to him deliberately wearing loose clothing over his lean frame. It has also been suggested that Jackson adopted a careful sideways stance to ensure that his heart was obstructed. The bullet broke some of Jackson's ribs and had ended up lodged inches from his heart. While Jackson could easily have been incapacitated by such a wound, an unconfirmed account later claimed that while conversing with a friend on his deathbed he stated, "If he had shot me through the brain, sir, I should still have killed him."

Doctors determined that the bullet lodged in Jackson's chest was too close to his heart to operate, so Jackson carried it for the rest of his life, suffering much pain from the wound. Locals were outraged that Dickinson had to stand defenseless while Jackson re-cocked and shot him. This was a confusing application of the rules of dueling, as snaps were considered as good as a shot. A snap implies that the hammer fell completely and failed to cause a shot, but a half cock is not a snap. Dickinson's second nervously permitted Jackson to re-cock his pistol. Some might claim that Jackson could have shot into the air or shot only to injure Dickinson; this would have been considered sufficient satisfaction under dueling rules. Jackson replied that Dickinson had meant to "kill the gent," so Jackson had also shot to kill. Jackson's reputation suffered greatly from the duel.

Dickinson was originally buried on a family plantation (now on the outskirts of Nashville), but was reinterred in the Old City Cemetery in Nashville after his grave was rediscovered in 2010. By that time, the original grave site had become unmarked and claims had been made that his remains were buried elsewhere.

See also
List of people killed in duels

References

External links

1780 births
1806 deaths
People from Caroline County, Maryland
American lawyers
Duelling fatalities
American duellists
Deaths by firearm in Kentucky
Andrew Jackson